Zehrental is a municipality in the district of Stendal, in Saxony-Anhalt, Germany. It was formed on 1 January 2010, by the merger of the former municipalities Gollensdorf and Groß Garz.

References

Stendal (district)